Prolycopene isomerase (CRTISO, carotene cis-trans isomerase, ZEBRA2 (gene), carotene isomerase, carotenoid isomerase) is an enzyme with systematic name 7,9,7',9'-tetracis-lycopene cis-trans-isomerase. This enzyme catalyses the following chemical reaction

 7,9,7',9'-tetracis-lycopene  all-trans-lycopene

This enzyme is involved in carotenoid biosynthesis.

References

External links 
 

EC 5.2.1